The Union of People for Education and Science or UPES party was a social-liberal political party that existed in Russia from 2002 to 2007.

The party was formed by a group of politicians who left Yabloko, led by Vyacheslav Vladimirovich Igrunov. Their political priorities included social protection, general liberal values, and support for science and education. The party received 0.17% of the vote in the 2003 Russian legislative election. On October 30, 2004, the party joined a coalition with the Patriotic Party of Russia. On March 21, 2005, the party signed an agreement with the Russian Party of Life. On August 8, 2006, the Federal Service for State Registration, Cadastre and Cartography ruled that the party lacks the legally required number of members, and it was dissolved in February 2007.

References

External links
Official web site
Official web site of Vyacheslav Vladimirovich Igrunov

2002 establishments in Russia
2007 disestablishments in Russia
Social liberal parties
Political parties established in 2002
Political parties established in 2007